The GIDS Uqab (lit. GIDS Eagle) is a tactical unmanned reconnaissance aerial vehicle built and developed by the Global Industrial Defence Solutions (GIDS) for the joint drone program of the Pakistan Navy and Pakistan Army. The Uqab is a tactical system which can be used for damage assessment, reconnaissance operations, artillery fire corrections, and can perform other variety of security and military operations.

Influence from the design of SATUMA Jasoos, it was developed by the GIDS and its electronics were upgraded by the NeScom to meet requirement for the Navy and Army. Uqab is designed for executing the Army/Navy's joint missions, where nearly ~30 Uqabs have been inducted in army's drone program while one squadron is active in navy's drone program.

Development

Development began in 2007 on the basis of the United States' drone program and the contract was awarded to Global Industrial Defence Solutions (GIDS). The Uqab's features a strong resembles from the AAI RQ-7 Shadow, which at one point were being offered by the US to Pakistan.

The Uqab program was designed for Pakistan Army's drone program and it took its first flight on 20 March 2008.

In the Army's drone program, the Uqab has been used for the battle damage assessment, aerial reconnaissance, artillery fire correction, joint forces operations, search and rescue missions, coastal area surveillance, route monitoring, internal security, mob control and flood relief operations.

The Uqab program eventually expanded from Army to Navy with combined Army/Navy team managed by the Navy's drone program in 2011. The Navy's ran several trial based operations with the management from the Army before commissioning the drone program of its own. During its trial phase, the Navy's Uqab drone crashed inside the premises of the National Oil Refinery located in Korangi Town. Major electronics upgrades were performed by the NeScom for the before Uqab joined the Navy's drone program.

On 20 July 2011, Uqab was inducted in Navy's drone program and commissioned a ground base located near the Mehran Naval Base. Uqabs usually flown from a runway strip for take-off and landings like normal aircraft. A proper command and control mechanism installed in a truck that records the feedback sent by the drone comes along the Uqab system.

Ground Control Station

Ground Control Station is a truck mounted air-conditioned, insulated container which is equipped with standard, ruggedized consoles.

Characteristics

User friendly mission planning and execution
Mission de-briefing & simulation
In-flight mission re-programming
Flexible waypoints entry & editing during flight (direct from map & keypad)
Mission parameter & flight data logger for post flight analysis & simulation
Real time video and telemetry data
Moving map software
Geo-referencing
Easy payload (camera) controls
Separate consoles for mission commander, UAV pilot & payload operator
Easy to read displays and gauges
Standby control links (redundancy)
Back-up power supply

Export

Pakistan has attracted serious interest Uqab unmanned air system (UAS) from Bahrain and other countries in Asia and Africa, according to company officials, Potential Uqab customers include the UAE, Indonesia, Turkmenistan and Egypt.

Accidents

An Uqab UAV of Pakistan Navy crashed in an oil refinery in Karachi when the UAV hit a bird on 2011.

Specifications

|ref=

See also

 Unmanned aerial vehicle
 List of unmanned aerial vehicles
 GIDS Shahpar
 Shahpar-2

References

Unmanned military aircraft of Pakistan
Science and technology in Pakistan